Lionel Smit (born 22 October 1982, Pretoria, South Africa) is a South African artist, known for his contemporary portraiture executed through large canvases and sculptures.

Smit lives and works in Cape Town, South Africa, but is also represented internationally in London. His work has been exhibited at the National Portrait Gallery in London where it received the Viewer’s Choice Award, He received a Ministerial Award from the South African Department of Culture in 2013 for Visual Art.

History 
Born in 1982 in Pretoria, South Africa, Smit was exposed to sculpture through his father Anton Smit, who worked from his studio adjacent to the family home.  This studio played a central role in Lionel’s upbringing. By age twelve, Smit was already working in clay and considered himself primarily as a sculptor. At sixteen his parents separated, after which Lionel, a student at Pretoria’s Pro Arte School of Arts at the time, began to use the empty studio space his father occupied for painting.

Work and subject matter 
Lionel Smit’s art is defined by a relationship between sculpture and painting.

Smit is based in Strand, Cape Town. He has achieved international success including sell-out exhibitions in London and Hong Kong.

Local acclaim 
Lionel Smit has also enjoyed success in his home country of South Africa, where his work has featured in local publications such as Elle South Africa and Elle Decoration.

Qualifications and awards 
 2013 Visitors' Choice Award, BP Portrait Award, National Portrait Gallery, London
 2013 Ministerial Award from Department of Culture for Visual Art, Western Cape Government
 2009 Merit Award, Vuleka, Sanlam Art Competition, Cape Town
 2008 Achievement Award, Pro Arte School of Arts
 2000 First prize in the MTN Art Colours Awards of Gauteng
 1999/2000 Best painting student, Pro Arte School of Arts

Selected exhibitions 

 2015 
 Close/Perspective, solo exhibition, Everard Read, Johannesburg
 Origins, solo exhibition, Rook & Raven, London
 Obscura, solo exhibition, Everard Read, Cape Town
 Art Central Art Fair, featured artist, Rook & Raven Gallery, Hong Kong
 Accumulation of Disorder, installation, Independent Art Projects, MASS MoCA Campus, USA

 2014

 Art Taipei, The Cat Street Gallery, Taiwan
 Contronym, solo exhibition, The Cat Street Gallery, Hong Kong
 Morphous, solo exhibition and installation, Circa, Johannesburg
 Cumulus, solo exhibition, Rook & Raven, London
 Fugitive Identity, group exhibition, Cynthia Reeves, USA

 2013

 Art Miami Fair, featured artist, Cynthia Reeves, Miami 
 IS Sculpture, solo exhibition, IsArt, Tokara, Stellenbosch 
 Strarta Art Fair, Saatchi Gallery, Rook & Raven, London 
 Fragmented, solo exhibition, Rook & Raven, London 
 Accumulation, solo exhibition, Everard Read, Johannesburg 
 BP Portrait Award Exhibition, Viewers' Choice Award, National Portrait Gallery, London 
 Wonder Works Exhibition, The Cat Street Gallery, Hong Kong 
 Metal Work Public sculpture, Stellenbosch

 2012 

 Compendium, solo exhibition, 34FineArt, Cape Town
 Accumulation of Disorder, installation, University of Stellenbosch Gallery, Stellenbosch
 Strata, solo exhibition, Rook and Raven, London
 Robert Bowman Gallery, India Art Fair, India
 Jhb Art Fair, Everard Read

 2011 

 Surface, solo exhibition, Artspace, Johannesburg
 34FineArt, ArtMonaco ‘11, Monaco

 2010 

 Out of the Office, group exhibition, Kunstmuseum Bochum, Germany
 Cynthia Reeves Projects, Art Miami, USA
 We are not Witches, Saatchi Gallery, London
 Submerge, solo exhibition, 34FineArt, Cape Town

 2009 

 F.A.C.E.T., Charity Auction, Christie’s, London
 Relate, solo exhibition, Grande Provence, Franschhoek

Catalogues 
 Cumulus LIONEL SMIT, Rook & Raven, London 2014
 Formulation LIONEL SMIT, Tokara, Stellenbosch 2013
 Accumulation LIONEL SMIT, Everard Read, Johannesburg 2013
 Strata LIONEL SMIT, Rook & Raven, London, 2012
 Surface LIONEL SMIT, Artspace, Johannesburg 2011
 We are not Witches, Saatchi Gallery, London 2011
 Submerge LIONEL SMIT, 34FineArt, October 2010
 Christie’s, F.A.C.E.T (catalogue cover), October 2009
 Residue, Grande Provence Gallery, October 2009
 Group therapy, Sandton Civic Gallery, 2005
 Pretoria, Everard Read Gallery, November 2004

Selected collections 
 Ellerman Contemporary 
 Standard Chartered Bank 
 Laurence Graff
 Rand Merchant Bank
 European Investment Bank
 Johannesburg City Council
 Saronsberg Wine Estate
 Grainvest Futures
 Delaire Graff Wine Estate
 South African Embassy, Nigeria
 Parkdev
 Johann Jacobs Museum

References

1982 births
Living people